Cheap Street may refer to:
 Cheap Street, Bath, a historic street in Bath, England
 Cheap Street, Frome, a historic street in Frome, England
 Cheap Street Press, a defunct American publishing company